"Fortunate Son" is a song by the American rock band Creedence Clearwater Revival released on their fourth studio album, Willy and the Poor Boys in November 1969. It was previously released as a single, together with "Down on the Corner", in September 1969. It soon became an anti-war movement anthem and an expressive symbol of the counterculture's opposition to U.S. military involvement in the Vietnam War and solidarity with the soldiers fighting it. The song has been featured extensively in pop culture depictions of the Vietnam War and the anti-war movement.

The song reached number 14 on the United States charts on November 22, 1969, the week before Billboard changed its methodology on double-sided hits. The tracks combined to climb to number 9 the next week, on the way to peaking at number 3 three more weeks later, on 20 December 1969.  It won the RIAA Gold Disc award in December 1970. Pitchfork Media placed it at number 17 on its list of "The 200 Greatest Songs of the 1960s". Rolling Stone placed it at number 99 on its "500 Greatest Songs of All Time" list. In 2013, the song was added to the National Recording Registry by the Library of Congress for being "culturally, historically, or aesthetically significant."

Origin 
The song, released during the peak period of the U.S. involvement in the Vietnam War, is not explicit in its criticism of that war in particular, rather, it "speaks more to the unfairness of class than war itself," according to its author, John Fogerty. "It's the old saying about rich men making war and poor men having to fight them." In 2015, while on the television show The Voice, he also said:

According to his 2015 memoir, Fogerty was thinking about David Eisenhower, the grandson of President Dwight D. Eisenhower, who married Julie Nixon, the daughter of then-President-elect Richard Nixon in 1968, when he wrote "Fortunate Son". Eisenhower spent three years in the military, most of it as an officer aboard the USS Albany in the Mediterranean Sea.

Ultimate Classic Rock critic Bryan Wawzenek rated the lyrics of "Fortunate Son" as Fogerty's greatest, saying "It’s not just Fogerty’s emotion, but the words that make this song great. 'Star-spangled eyes' is one of the best descriptive phrases in all of rock and roll, a uniquely American twist on rose-colored glasses."

Interpretive legacy 

The song has been widely used to protest against military actions as well as elitism in a broader sense in Western society, particularly in the United States; as an added consequence of its popularity, it has even been used in completely unrelated situations, such as to advertise blue jeans. It was played at a campaign rally for Donald Trump. Fogerty found this to be confounding. Fogerty later issued a cease and desist order, noting that Trump obtained a draft deferment.

Bruce Springsteen, Dave Grohl, and Zac Brown attracted criticism when they performed the song together at the November 2014 Concert for Valor in Washington D.C. Fogerty, a military veteran, defended their song choice.

Cover versions
The song has since been recorded or performed by many artists. It was initially embraced in the punk and hardcore community with versions by The Circle Jerks, The Minutemen, DOA and Decry. Fogerty recorded a version of the song with Foo Fighters for his 2013 album Wrote a Song for Everyone.

Bob Seger and the Silver Bullet Band recorded the song for their 1986 album Like a Rock.

Licensed uses

Literature

The song is quoted several times in the 2006 thriller novel by American writer Don Winslow, The Winter of Frankie Machine in which one of the characters is a "senator's son" referred to as the "Fortunate Son".

Video games
The song is used in the introduction sequence of the game Battlefield Vietnam where it is among a list of in-game playable tracks. The song was also used during the E3 announcement trailer for Battlefield: Bad Company 2: Vietnam and is also the main menu song for the game and plays mid-game in vehicle radios.

"Fortunate Son" was also included in the game Call of Duty: Black Ops at the start and ending of the level "S.O.G". Its use is an anachronism, as the level takes place during the Battle of Khe Sanh, a year before the song was released.

In Homefront, the song is played during the chapter "Golden Gate".

A cover of the song was released as DLC for Rock Band in 2007. The first appearance of the song came out before real instruments were integrated. The original version was made available to download on March 1, 2011, for use in Rock Band 3 PRO mode which takes advantage of the use of a real guitar / bass guitar, along with standard MIDI-compatible electronic drum kits in addition to vocals.  The master recording by CCR was made available as well in 2010.  The song is also playable on basic controllers in Guitar Hero: Warriors of Rock.

The song is also played in 2016's Mafia 3 but its use is an anachronism along with "Bad Moon Rising" as both songs were released in 1969 whereas Mafia 3 takes place in 1968.

The song is briefly played as both its original recording and a solo a cappella rendition, sung by Jessy Carolina, in BioShock Infinite.

In 2014, the song was included in the enhanced re-release of Grand Theft Auto V for the PS4, Xbox One, and PC, as part of the playlist of the fictional in-game radio station Los Santos Rock Radio.

The song was used during a mission to destroy rigged voting machines in Watch Dogs 2.

The song's title is referenced in Team Fortress 2 as a cosmetic helmet called the "Fortunate Son", which can be equipped by the Scout class.

Film and television
In 1987, the song was briefly used in the animated film Pinocchio and the Emperor of the Night.

In the 1994 film Forrest Gump, "Fortunate Son" is played in the scene where Forrest and Bubba arrive in a combat zone in South Vietnam aboard a U.S. Army helicopter.

In the 2004 version of the film The Manchurian Candidate, a cover version of this song performed by Wyclef Jean is featured and is the opening track of the closing credits.

In 2007, this song was used diegetically in Live Free or Die Hard and in the end credits.

In the 2009 American Dad episode "In Country...Club", "Fortunate Son" plays during a Vietnam War reenactment battle.

in 2010, the song was sung by Jeffster on the TV show Chuck.

In 2012 the song was used for the end credits of Peter Berg's film Battleship.

In 2015, the song was used in the TV Show The Strain specifically during the episode "The Silver Angel"

In 2016, the song was included in the soundtrack album for the film Suicide Squad.

In the 2016 film War Dogs, the song is used in the scene where David, Efraim and Marlboro are saved by the U.S. military while being pursued by Iraqi gunmen.

In the 2018 Family Guy episode "'Family Guy' Through the Years" (presented as a compilation of old episodes from the series' "60 year run", parodying anniversary specials), Glenn Quagmire, portrayed in a Vietnam veteran in 1973, experiences PTSD-like symptoms from the incessant use of the song and "For What It's Worth" by Buffalo Springfield as audible background music during the war.

A cover by Cat Power was used in a 2019 episode of the Netflix series The Punisher.

Commercials
An edited version of the song was used in a Wrangler commercial because John Fogerty "long ago signed away legal control of his old recordings to Creedence's record label, Fantasy Records." In this case, the advertiser eventually stopped using the song, as Fogerty related in a later interview:

Charts

Weekly charts

Year-end charts

Certifications

See also
 List of anti-war songs
 List of songs about the Cold War

References

External links
Classic Tracks: Creedence Clearwater Revival "Fortunate Son"
Library of Congress essay on the song's addition to the National Recording Registry.

1969 singles
1969 songs
Anti-war songs
Cat Power songs
Creedence Clearwater Revival songs
Death Cab for Cutie songs
Dropkick Murphys songs
Fantasy Records singles
American hard rock songs
Song recordings produced by John Fogerty
Songs about soldiers
Songs about luck
Songs about the military
Songs of the Vietnam War
Songs written by John Fogerty
United States National Recording Registry recordings